Dair Asanovich Asanov (20 May 1922 – 18 September 2009) was a Kyrgyz Soviet Army major general and a Hero of the Soviet Union.

Biography 
Asanov was born on 30 May 1922 in the Naryn oblast of the Kyrgyz SSR. Before enlisting in the army he worked as a teacher on a collective farm. He worked as a gunner of the 1208th Fighter Artillery Regiment. In January 1942, he was awarded for his actions when his gun direct fire ignited a tank of the Germans. He was awarded the title of Hero of the Soviet Union on 26 October 1943 for his heroic acts during World War II. After the war, Asanov graduated from the 1st Guards Ulyanovsk Tank School 1946, the Tashkent Higher Tank Command School in 1950, and the V.I. Lenin Political-Military Academy 1956. He worked as a commander commissariats in Tokmak, Chui, and the Leninsky district of the city of Frunze from 1961 to 1984. From 1985 to 1996 he was the director of the Kyrgyz State National Military Lyceum. In 1994, he retired with the rank of major general.

He died on 18 September 2009 in Bishkek at the age of 88. At the time of his death he was the last Hero of the Soviet Union from Kyrgyzstan.

Legacy 
The Kyrgyz State National Military Lyceum (which he commanded from 1985 to 1996) is named after Asanov. His wife Jamalbubu-Apa was awarded the Jubilee Medal "75 Years of Victory in the Great Patriotic War 1941–1945" in 2020.

Awards 
 Hero of the Soviet Union (Gold Star No. 2645)
 Order of Lenin
 Two Order of the Patriotic War, 1st class
 Two Order of the Red Star
 Order of the Badge of Honor
 Medal for Battle Merit (3)

References 

1922 births
2009 deaths
Kyrgyzstani generals
Soviet major generals
Soviet military personnel of World War II
Heroes of the Soviet Union
Recipients of the Order of Lenin
Recipients of the Order of the Red Star
Communist Party of the Soviet Union members
People from Naryn Region
Tashkent Higher Tank Command School alumni
Lenin Military Political Academy alumni